A Secret Wish is the debut album by German synthpop band Propaganda. Released by ZTT Records in 1985, it was produced by Stephen Lipson under the supervision of label boss Trevor Horn. The singles "Duel" and "Dr. Mabuse" were both Top 30 UK chart hits. The track "p:Machinery" (a line from which gives the album its title) was also released as a single and was featured in an episode of the '80s TV show Miami Vice and also on the video "Drum"  by Duran Duran's Simon Le Bon for his Whitbread Round the World Race in 1985.

The album was followed up quickly in November 1985 by the Wishful Thinking companion remix album.

A Secret Wish has been reissued a number of times – including as a deluxe 20th anniversary edition and as a multi-channel SACD. The most recent re-release is the 2010 double CD deluxe edition which marks the album's 25th anniversary.

Reception

Track listing

Original 1985 vinyl album release 
A – WITHIN
 "Dream Within a Dream" – 8:04
 "The Murder of Love" – 5:12
 "Jewel" – 3:10
 "Duel" – 4:43
B – WITHOUT
 "p:Machinery" – 3:50
 "Sorry for Laughing" – 3:25
 "Dr. Mabuse (First Life)" – 5:00
 "The Chase" – 4:03
 "The Last Word/Strength to Dream" – 3:01

"Dream Within a Dream" has the lyrics of the poem "A Dream Within a Dream" by Edgar Allan Poe. The original 8.04-minute version features a guitar solo, the longer version has the solo omitted. "Sorry for Laughing" is a cover of the 1981 single by Josef K. "The Last Word" is an instrumental based on "Dr. Mabuse". "Strength to Dream" is the opening line from "Dream Within a Dream". On the sleeve and label, "Jewel" and "Duel" were listed as a single track, whereas "The Last Word" and "Strength to Dream" were separate.

Original 1985 CD release 

 "Dream Within a Dream" [extended] – 9:09
 "The Murder of Love" – 5:12
 "Jewel" – 6:22
 "Duel" [CD remix] – 4:42
 "Frozen Faces" – 4:25
 "p:Machinery" [single mix] – 3:51
 "Sorry for Laughing" – 3:27
 "The Chase" – 4:04
 "Dr Mabuse" [CD remix] – 10:41

"Jewel" is the 'cut rough' 12-inch (vocal) mix, with the opening seconds replaced by the album intro. "Duel" has minor changes within the mix, as does "p:Machinery", appearing here as the single mix. The version of "Dr Mabuse" here is the first 12-inch mix ('Das Testaments des Mabuse'), with the final minute replaced by the end of "The Last Word/Strength to Dream" from the original LP.

The three-month delay between the vinyl and CD releases gave producer Steve Lipson the opportunity to remix the album to his satisfaction, and he said that he considered the CD to be the definitive version.

The original US release contained the UK CD in a longbox.  Several years later, a US printing was done that had the vinyl tracks but mislabeled with the original UK CD artwork. Most subsequent reissues featured a hybrid track listing, following the vinyl for the most part, but with the addition of the longer vocal "Jewel" and "Frozen Faces".

Japanese CD reissue 

 "Dream Within a Dream" – 8:04
 "The Murder of Love" – 5:18
 "Jewel" – 3:11
 "Duel" – 4:48
 "Frozen Faces" – 4:25
 "p:Machinery" – 3:50
 "Sorry for Laughing" – 3:27
 "Dr. Mabuse (first life)" – 5:04
 "The Chase" – 4:05
 "The Last Word/Strength to Dream" – 3:02
 "Femme Fatale (The Woman with the Orchid)" – 3:21
 "Dr. Mabuse (13th Life)" – 6:36
 "Duel (bitter-sweet)" – 7:36
 "(the beta wraparound of) p:Machinery" – 10:47

20th Anniversary reissue 
CD
 "Dream Within a Dream" – 9:08
 "The Murder of Love" – 5:12
 "Jewel" – 6:22
 "Duel" – 4:42
 "Frozen Faces" – 4:25
 "p:Machinery" – 3:51
 "Sorry for Laughing" – 3:27
 "The Chase" – 4:04
 "Dr. Mabuse" – 10:41

DVD
 "Duel (Version 1)" – 4:52
 "p:Machinery" – 3:48
 "Dr. Mabuse (Version 1)" – 4:50
 "Dr. Mabuse (Version 2)" – 4:30

SACD release 

 "Dream Within a Dream" – 8:06
 "The Murder of Love" – 5:17
 "Jewel" – 6:23
 "Duel" – 4:48
 "Frozen Faces" – 4:22
 "p:Machinery" – 3:50
 "Sorry for Laughing" – 3:27
 "Dr. Mabuse" – 5:04
 "The Chase" – 4:05
 "Strength to Dream" – 3:00

2010 2CD Deluxe "Element Series" Edition 

"Do Well" is the cassette single version of "Duel". "Die tausend Augen des Mabuse" is an extended version of the 6'31" twelve-inch mix (aka "13th Life"), without the early fade out. "Thought" (parts one and two) appeared together on Wishful Thinking (part two is the "p:Machinery" reprise). The Goodnight 32 mix of "p:Machinery" was released in 1985 on a 7-inch single as "p:Machinery (reactivated)".

Personnel
Ralf Dörper: keys
Michael Mertens: percussion
Susanne Freytag: vocals
Claudia Brücken: vocals
Andreas Thein: programming

Also appearing: Andrew Richards, John McGeoch, Steve Howe, David Sylvian, Glenn Gregory, Trevor Horn, Johnathan Sorrell, Ian Mosley

Charts

References

1985 debut albums
Propaganda (band) albums
Albums produced by Trevor Horn
Albums produced by Stephen Lipson
ZTT Records albums